The Don Honorio Ventura State University (commonly referred to as DHVSU) is a state university in Bacolor, Pampanga, Philippines. It has six satellite campuses in Apalit, Candaba, Porac, Mexico, Santo Tomas and Lubao in the province of Pampanga. It is considered as the oldest vocational school in Far East Asia.

History
DHVSU was established on November 4, 1861, as Escuela de Artes y Oficios de Bacolor, a grammar school, by an Augustinian friar, Fr. Juan P. Zita, aided by civic leader Don Felino Gil on land donated by the Suarez family. The school was renamed Don Honorio Ventura College of Arts and Trades (DHVCAT) in 1978 and was converted to a university and renamed Don Honorio Ventura Technological State University (DHVTSU) in 2009.

President Rodrigo Duterte signed Republic Act 11169, which renamed Don Honorio Ventura Technological State University into Don Honorio Ventura State University. Renaming of the school was an idea of third District Congressman Aurelio Gonzales Jr.; he said that renaming of the university will bring about the modification of restrictive provisions of Republic Act (RA) 9832 and elevate the status of this higher education institution from a technological to a comprehensive university. Additional courses in the liberal arts, medical, and allied medical fields shall be offered in addition to those specified in Section 3 of RA 9832.

In 2018, DHVSU was granted the ISO 9001-2015 Certification by The International Certification Network. One year after, the university was granted the SUC Level III status per Memorandum Order No. 09 series of 2019 of the Commission on Higher Education. DHVSU main campus is located at Barangay Cabambangan, Municipality of Bacolor, Pampanga and it has currently six satellite campuses located at Porac, Mexico, Santo Tomas, Lubao, Apalit and Candaba in the province of Pampanga. Its two satellite campuses, including Apalit and Candaba, have opened their classes in 2021.

Notable alumni
 Jayson Castro - Filipino professional basketball player (High School Dept.)

References

State universities and colleges in the Philippines
Educational institutions established in 1861
Universities and colleges in Pampanga
Engineering universities and colleges in the Philippines
1861 establishments in the Philippines